Zimri Tribe is also called Zimri or Mizri', is a Pashtun tribe in Balochistan and Khyber Pakhtunkhwa, Pakistan. Some Zimri live's in Afghanistan. 
The name Zimri or Zmarai means "fierce tiger" in the Pashto language. The history shows that one day at the place located in Musakhail city between the Sherani and Isot, the father of Zimri had a fight with tigers in the mountains. After being victorious, the father of Musakhail gave him the honour Zmarai (lion), which means "lion" in Pashto. Zimri, Mizri, the same nation named changed due to the languages of different areas.

Rough estimates show their population to be more than 990,000–1100,000.

Location
They live in the Balochistan and Khyber Pakhtunkhwa provinces of Pakistan. In Balochistan, the name Zimri is common, but in the areas of Khyber Pakhtunkhwa, the name Gumoriani or Gumaryani is used. Some of them live in Sibi and they call themselves Mizri''. These migrations have occurred primarily due to tribal conflicts and financial instability in the region. They are living in the mountainous range associated with Hazrat Suleman. They live between Sherani and Isot tribes. The mountains on which they live are very fertile. The Zhmaryani country is drained by small hills torrents: the Ramak and Guzai.

Due to some clashes, Zimri migrated from Musakhail to other cities of Pakistan. 

In Khyber Pakhtunkhwa, Pakistan they are living in the famous village of Pirpiai, also known as Little England due to its high literacy rate, Pashtun Ghari, Amankot and Mohib Banda in Nowshera. Fazl Ur Rehman Khan a bureaucrat in 1940s to 60s titled as Conqueror of Bajaur belonged to Pashtun Ghari. The pashto poet and philosopher Dost Muhammad Kamil, cousin and brother in law of Fazl Ur Rehman Khan and Capt. Muhammad Iqbal, Hilal-e-Jurat are also buried in Pashtun Ghari. The founding father of Pirpiai , Pir Muhammad Khan was the son of Daulat Khan. Daulat Khan was a commander and confidant of Nadir Shah Afshar, the ruler of Iran. Nadir Shah awarded the area to Daulat Khan, his confidant. Daulat Khan belonged to the Zhmaryani tribe.

Sub-tribes
 Anzra Khel (largest by population)
 Ayub Khel (Alizai, malazai)
 Hussain Zai
 Muhammad Khel

References

Sarbani Pashtun tribes